Nicolae Nagy (born 8 March 1942) is a Romanian former football forward.

International career
Nicolae Nagy played one game at international level for Romania under coach Ilie Oană in a friendly which ended with a 2–1 victory against Israel.

Honours
Dinamo București
Cupa României: 1967–68
ASA Târgu Mureș
Divizia B: 1970–71

References

External links
Nicolae Nagy at Labtof.ro

1942 births
Living people
Romanian footballers
Romania international footballers
Association football forwards
Liga I players
Liga II players
Victoria București players
FC Argeș Pitești players
FC Dinamo București players
ASA Târgu Mureș (1962) players
CS Gaz Metan Mediaș players
Sportspeople from Târgu Mureș